is a Japanese manga artist, who is best known for the manga Grenadier.  He also created a number of one shot manga prior to that, also published in Kadokawa magazines.  Grenadier started with two one-offs in November 2000 and February 2001, but didn't begin regular serialisation until June 2002.  At the end of 2004, a 12 episode anime series was created by Studio Live and Group TAC, and broadcast on the satellite station WOWOW.  The seventh and last volume of the manga was published 26 May 2005.

Works 
 , 2003–2005, Shōnen Ace (Kadokawa Shoten)
 , 2008, Comic Charge (Kadokawa Shoten)
 , 2009, Comic Valkyrie'

One shots 
 Insect Mission, July 1999 Shōnen Ace
 Sora Sekai (空想世界), May 1999 Shōnen Ace
 Tasogare Asobi (黄昏アソビ), September 1999 Shōnen Ace
 White, February 2000 Shōnen Ace
 Skull Rabbit (スカル·ラビット), February 2000 Ace Next
 Teru x 2 Hiyori (てる×2日和), June 2000 Shōnen Ace
 Slugger (スラッガー), July 2000 Ace Next
 Invisible Kingdom Series "Good Morning", January 2002 Ace Next

References

External links
 Kadokawa Grenadier website (Japanese)
 Authors under 'ka', from 麒麟舘 (Japanese)
 Contents of Shōnen Ace and Ace Next back issues (Japanese)
 

Year of birth missing (living people)
Living people
Manga artists from Shizuoka Prefecture